Aechmea lactifera is a species of flowering plant in the genus Aechmea. This species is endemic to eastern Brazil.

References

lactifera
Flora of Brazil
Plants described in 2007